Route nationale 79, or RN 79, is a French national road connecting Montmarault to Mâcon. RN79 passes through the mountain pass Col du Bois Clair near Sologny. It is being upgraded to motorway A79, the western section of which was completed in November 2022.

References

79